In addition to their first team competing in the Scottish Premiership, Hibernian F.C. also maintain further teams for younger age groups playing in competitions such as the Scottish Challenge Cup and the Scottish Youth Cup within the club's academy.

Competitions
In the early 1950s, reserve teams were incorporated into the third tier of the senior Scottish Football League, with Hibernian 'A' taking part for six seasons of the arrangement. Hibs fielded a team for many years in various separate reserve competitions culminating in the Scottish Premier Reserve League, which was abandoned in 2009. An under-20 side then took part in the SPFL Development League until it was disbanded in 2018 – Hibs were its final champions. An SPFL Reserve League was set up in its place, but Hibs intimated at the end of its first season (2018–19) that they would withdraw from the Reserve League to play a variety of challenge matches. They later entered a small league (under-21 plus three overage) along with three other Scottish clubs and Brentford and Huddersfield Town from the English leagues.

Prior to the introduction of the Scottish Premier League in 1998, the Under-20s previously competed in the youth league administered by the Scottish Football League. Since 2015 it has been possible for the Hibs academy to participate in the UEFA Youth League by the Under-17 side winning the previous season's league at that age group. This was first achieved in 2022, and Hibs defeated Norwegian side Molde FK on penalties in the first round of the 2022–23 competition. They then progressed through the second round by a 3–1 aggregate score against French club Nantes, but then lost 2–1 to Borussia Dortmund in the knockout phase.

For the 2016–17 edition of the Scottish Challenge Cup, Under-20 teams of Premiership clubs were granted entry to compete against adult teams for the first time in the modern era. As Hibs were in the second tier that season, it was their senior team who entered the competition. Hibs under-20s first entered the Challenge Cup in the 2017–18 edition, losing 2–1 to Elgin City in the first round.

Academy background
Hibs' main area of recruitment is the Lothian and Borders region around Edinburgh which has a population of around one million. They face a constant battle with rivals Heart of Midlothian to sign the most promising youngsters in the area. In the past both Hibs and Hearts have signed many players from youth club Hutchison Vale.

In 2016 the Investors in People Silver Award was bestowed on the Hibernian Academy for its work with the young people connected to the organisation.

In 2017, the Hibernian academy was one of eight across the country designated 'elite' status on the introduction of Project Brave, an SFA initiative to concentrate the development of the best young players at a smaller number of clubs with high quality facilities and coaching than was previously the case.

Although the official home of the academy teams is the club's training centre near Ormiston, the Under-20 matches usually take place at lower league stadia: Ainslie Park in Edinburgh, home of Spartans F.C. is used most frequently, and fixtures have also been played at the indoor Oriam facility which was the official venue for the reserves in the 2018–19 season.

U20 Development squad

Note: Several players on the list have either made first team appearances for Hibs, or have been loaned to other SPFL clubs; however they can still be selected for Development League fixtures whenever available to play.

Honours
Reserves
SFL Division C (North-East)
Winners: 1949–50
Runners-up: 1952–53, 1954–55
Scottish Reserve League
Winners: 1945–46, 1946–47, 1947–48, 1948–49
Scottish Reserve League Cup
Winners: 1946–47, 1947–48, 1948–49, 1965–66
Scottish 2nd XI Cup
Winners: 1884–85, 1938–39, 1945–46, 1946–47

Youth
Scottish Youth Cup 
Winners: 1992, 2009, 2018
Runners-up: 1990, 1991
SPFL Development League
Winners: 2008–09, 2017–18, 2021–22

Notes

Former reserve/youth team players

This list focuses on the players who have graduated through Hibernian's academy, and have made at least 50 first team appearances, since the inception of the SPL in 1998. This includes a group considered a "golden generation", who helped Hibs to Scottish League Cup finals in 2004 and 2007 (the latter of which they won), and most of whom went on to play for Scotland. Many other of the club's earlier notable players also came through the youth system. Players currently at Hibs in bold.

Kenny Miller
Tam McManus
Ian Murray
Garry O'Connor 
Derek Riordan
Scott Brown
Steven Whittaker
Kevin Thomson
Steven Fletcher
Kevin McCann
 
Lewis Stevenson
David Wotherspoon 
Paul Hanlon
Jordon Forster
Alex Harris
Danny Handling
Jason Cummings
Sam Stanton
 Oli Shaw
 Ryan Porteous

References

External links 
 Youth System background at Hibs.org.uk - 2005 article
Hibernian U20 at Soccerway

Hibernian F.C.
Scottish reserve football teams
Youth football in Scotland
Football academies in Scotland
UEFA Youth League teams